HMAS Tongkol was an auxiliary minesweeper which served in the Royal Australian Navy (RAN) during World War II.

Tongkol was built in 1926 by Smiths Dock Company, Middlesbrough as a fisheries research ship for the Malaysian Government which cost £23,000. Bought by Mr A. A. Murrell in 1929 from the Ceylon Fisheries, for his Sydney fishing fleet. At the start of World War II, Tongkol was requisitioned on 7 September 1939 and was commissioned into the RAN on 4 October 1939 as an auxiliary minesweeper. She was returned to her owners in 1946. She was attached to Minesweeping Group 50, based at Sydney. She was purchased outright by the RAN in late 1943, and paid off the same year. Sold back to local fishing trade, she was placed up for auction, after her owner closed business, in 1946. Her fate is unknown after she was placed under arrest in 1947, due to a dispute.

References

1926 ships
Ships built on the River Tees
Auxiliary ships of the Royal Australian Navy
Minesweepers of the Royal Australian Navy
Fishing ships of Australia
Iron and steel steamships of Australia